Eric Marc Alexander Smaling  (born 18 August 1957 in Amsterdam) is a Dutch politician and agronomist. As a member of the Socialist Party (Socialistische Partij) he was an MP between 14 May 2013 and 23 March 2017. He replaced Manja Smits, initially temporarily, and definitively from 15 April 2014).

Smaling studied agronomy at Wageningen University and Research Centre and specialised in soil science and manure. He was also a professor at this university. Since 2004, he has been a professor at ITC Enschede.

He is partner of children's writer Rindert Kromhout and resides in Weesp.

References

External links

1957 births
Living people
Dutch agronomists
Gay politicians
LGBT members of the Parliament of the Netherlands
Members of the House of Representatives (Netherlands)
Members of the Senate (Netherlands)
Politicians from Amsterdam
Socialist Party (Netherlands) politicians
Dutch soil scientists
Academic staff of the University of Twente
Wageningen University and Research alumni
Academic staff of Wageningen University and Research
21st-century Dutch politicians